The Donnas Turn 21 is the fourth studio album by the American hard rock band The Donnas, released in 2001 on Lookout!. Their last release on Lookout!, the album marks their transition away from their previous pop punk sound and towards a more hard rock sound.

As of 2005 it has sold 65,000 units in United States according to Nielsen SoundScan.

Track listing
All songs by Brett Anderson, Torry Castellano, Maya Ford and Allison Robertson, except where noted.

"Are You Gonna Move It For Me?" – 2:31
"Do You Wanna Hit It?" – 2:57
"40 Boys in 40 Nights" – 2:32
"Play My Game" – 3:02
"Midnite Snack" – 2:45
"Drivin' Thru My Heart" – 2:38
"You've Got a Crush on Me" – 2:30
"Little Boy" – 1:59
"Don't Get Me Busted" – 2:55
"Police Blitz" – 1:39
"Hot Pants" – 2:36
"Gimme a Ride" – 1:58
"Living After Midnight" (KK Downing, Rob Halford, Glenn Tipton) – 3:28
"Nothing to Do" – 7:26 (including hidden track)
"Drivin' Thru My Heart" (alternate version) (hidden track)

Japanese bonus track
<li>"School's Out" (Alice Cooper, Michael Bruce, Glen Buxton, Dennis Dunaway, Neal Smith)

Personnel
The Donnas
Brett Anderson - lead vocals
Allison Robertson - guitar, backing vocals
Maya Ford - bass, backing vocals
Torry Castellano - drums, percussion, backing vocals

Additional personnel
Danny Sullivan - tambourine

Production
Producer: Robert Shimp
Engineer: Robert Shimp
Assistant Engineer: Aaron Prellwitz
Mixing: Robert Shimp
Editing: Clint Roth
Artwork: Chris Appelgren

Charts
Album

References

External links

The Donnas albums
2001 albums
Lookout! Records albums